Drayton Valley-Calmar was a provincial electoral district in Alberta, Canada, mandated to return a single member to the Legislative Assembly of Alberta using the first-past-the-post method of voting from 1993 to 2012.

It elected a Progressive-Conservative MLA in each election from 1990s to 2012.

Drayton Valley-Calmar history

Boundary history

Members of the Legislative Assembly (MLAs)

Election results

1993 general election

1997 general election

2001 general election

2004 general election

2008 general election

Senate elections

2004 Senate nominee election district results

Voters had the option of selecting 4 Candidates on the Ballot

2004 Student Vote

On November 19, 2004 a Student Vote was conducted at participating Alberta schools to parallel the 2004 Alberta general election results. The vote was designed to educate students and simulate the electoral process for persons who have not yet reached the legal majority. The vote was conducted in 80 of the 83 provincial electoral districts with students voting for actual election candidates. Schools with a large student body that reside in another electoral district had the option to vote for candidates outside of the electoral district then where they were physically located.

See also
List of Alberta provincial electoral districts

References

External links
Elections Alberta
The Legislative Assembly of Alberta

Former provincial electoral districts of Alberta